Petrokimia Stadium (also known as Tri Dharma Stadium)  is a multi-use stadium in Gresik Regency, East Java, Indonesia. It has a capacity of 40,000 people and is the home of Gresik United (formerly known as Petrokimia Putra).

References

Gresik United
Gresik Regency
Football venues in Indonesia
Rugby union stadiums in Indonesia
Sports venues in Indonesia
Buildings and structures in East Java
Multi-purpose stadiums in Indonesia